Dowlatabad (also Romanized as Dowlatābād; also known as Daulatābād and Dsulstābād) is a village in Sheshdeh Rural District, Sheshdeh and Qarah Bulaq District, Fasa County, Fars Province, Iran. At the 2006 census, its population was 1,023, in 252 families.

References 

Populated places in Fasa County